Saint Pior (or Prior; 4th century) was an Egyptian monk and hermit in the desert of Scetis, one of the Desert Fathers, and a disciple of Anthony the Great. He lived to a great age.
His feast day is 17 June.

Monks of Ramsgate account

The monks of St Augustine's Abbey, Ramsgate wrote in their Book of Saints (1921),

Butler's account

The hagiographer Alban Butler (1710–1773) wrote in his Lives of the Fathers, Martyrs, and Other Principal Saints under June 17,

Baring-Gould's account

Sabine Baring-Gould (1834–1924) in his Lives Of The Saints wrote under June 17,

Sozomen's account

Henry Ruffner (1790–1861) in his The Fathers of the Desert draws on Sozomen and writes,

Palladius' Account
Palladius of Galatia (d. 420) writes,

Notes

Sources

 
 
 
 

Saints from Roman Egypt
4th-century deaths
Egyptian hermits
Desert Fathers